San Babila-8 P.M. is a 1976 Italian drama film directed by Carlo Lizzani. It was entered into the 10th Moscow International Film Festival.

Plot
The film is inspired by the events of violence that occurred in Piazza San Babila in Milan in 1975, where groups of neo-fascists and anarchist communists were the protagonists. Four Milanese boys are part of a fascist group, claiming with all sorts of violence a new order based on the squadrism of Benito Mussolini. The boys are fighting with the institutions and against the youth group of the communists and the anarchists, and often collide during the protests, with violent outcomes.

One day the leader of the fascist group asks Franco, the most insecure boy of the brigade, to perform a violent and demonstrative act against a randomly chosen communist boy, in order to redeem his "honor". So one night in Piazza San Babila the boys meet a couple of engaged, dressed in red (they are believed by some communists), and the group's madness pushes the boys to chase them, and to stab them. Franco is shocked and runs away from home, denouncing assault on the police.

Cast
 Daniele Asti as Franco
 Brigitte Skay as Lalla
 Giuliano Cesareo as Miki Castiglioni
 Pietro Brambilla as Fabrizio
 Pietro Giannuso as Alfredo
 Grazia Baccari as Paolo's girlfriend
 Gilberto Squizzato as Paolo

References

External links
 

1976 films
1976 drama films
Italian drama films
1970s Italian-language films
Films directed by Carlo Lizzani
Films scored by Ennio Morricone
Films set in Milan
1970s Italian films